Moroto Regional Referral Hospital, commonly known as Moroto Hospital is a hospital in the town of Moroto, in Northeastern Uganda. It is the referral hospital for the districts of Abim, Kaabong, Kotido, Moroto and Nakapiripirit and Napak.

Location

The coordinates of Moroto Hospital are: 02°31'53.0"N, 34°39'25.0"E (Latitude:2.531389, Longitude: 34.656944).

Overview
Moroto Hospital is a public hospital funded by the Uganda Ministry of Health. General care in the hospital is free. It is one of the thirteen regional referral hospitals in Uganda. The hospital is one of the fifteen internship hospitals where graduates of Ugandan medical schools can serve one year of internship under the supervision of qualified specialists and consultants. The bed capacity of Moroto Hospital was 114 beds as of June 2010.

Renovation
In 2015, the government of Uganda, using $52.6 million borrowed from the World Bank, rehabilitated and renovated seven hospitals, including Moroto Hospital. Moroto Regional Referral Hospital received (a) power houses, (b) a new out-patient department, (c) ventilated improved pit (VIP) latrines and (d) 15 new staff houses.

A new  water-supply reservoir was constructed, supplemented with solar-powered boreholes, as water sources. A new sewage system for the hospital was also installed.

See also
List of hospitals in Uganda
Karamoja
Karamojong language

References

External links
 The renovation of Moroto Regional Referral Hospital was funded by The World Bank under the Uganda Health Systems Strengthening Project
  Moroto District Internet Portal
 Moroto District Overview at Ugandatravelguide.com

Moroto Hospital
Hospitals established in 1940
1940 establishments in Uganda
Moroto District
Moroto Town
Karamoja
Northern Region, Uganda